Arūnas Pukelevičius (born 9 May 1973) is a retired Lithuanian football midfielder.

References

1973 births
Living people
Lithuanian footballers
FK Žalgiris players
Wisła Kraków players
Shenzhen F.C. players
FK Vėtra players
FC Vilnius players
FC TVMK players
FK Dainava Alytus players
Association football midfielders
Lithuania international footballers
Lithuanian expatriate footballers
Expatriate footballers in Poland
Lithuanian expatriate sportspeople in Poland
Expatriate footballers in China
Lithuanian expatriate sportspeople in China
Expatriate footballers in Estonia
Lithuanian expatriate sportspeople in Estonia